Michael Rory Littlewood is an American baseball coach. He played college baseball at BYU from 1985 to 1988, before playing professionally in 1988. He then served as the head coach of then Dixie State Rebels (later called "Red Storm", now Utah Tech Trailblazers) from 1996-2012, and then the BYU Cougars (2013–2022.)

Playing career
Littlewood was a third baseman at BYU, earning All-Conference as both a junior and senior.  He was drafted in the 27th round of the 1988 MLB Draft by the Milwaukee Brewers and played one season at Class-A Beloit Brewers.

Coaching career
Shortly after his playing career ended, Littlewood accepted the head coaching position at Alta High School in Sandy, Utah.  He remained for three seasons before moving to Dixie State, then a junior college in St. George, Utah.  Under Littlewood, the Rebels (and Red Storm) won 563 games, won one national championship, made four appearances in the National Junior College World Series, and claimed eight league titles.  Littlewood was named National JUCO Coach of the Year in 2004.  Dixie State transitioned to the Division II level under Littlewood in 2007.  Littlewood also served during this time as an NCAA basketball referee, working three NCAA Sweet 16s and two Elite 8s.

After being a finalist for the BYU head coaching position in 2000, when Vance Law earned the job, Littlewood was hired at BYU prior to the 2013 season.  In his first season, the Cougars tied for second in the West Coast Conference and qualified for the first WCC Tournament.

He was named the West Coast Conference Coach of the Year in 2019. On April 11, 2022, Littlewood resigned midseason for personal reasons.

Head coaching record
This table shows Littlewood's record as a head coach at the Division I level.

References

External links

Living people
1966 births
Baseball third basemen
Beloit Brewers players
BYU Cougars baseball coaches
BYU Cougars baseball players
College men's basketball referees in the United States
Utah Tech Trailblazers baseball coaches
High school baseball coaches in the United States